Noah is a Biblical patriarch who built an ark to save each kind of animal from the Great Flood

Noah may also refer to:

Places
 Noah, Georgia, an unincorporated community in the United States
 Noah, Tennessee, an unincorporated community in the United States

Name 
 Noah (American painter) (born 1971), an American artist
 Noah (name), a given name and surname (including a list of people with this name)
 King Noah, a wicked Nephite king from the Book of Mormon who burned the prophet Abinadi at the stake
 Noah, an early Jaredite king in the Book of Mormon
 Noah, one of the daughters of Zelophehad

Arts, entertainment, and media

Fictional entities
 Noah Kaiba the boss of the Big Five in Season 3 of the second series of Yu-Gi-Oh!
 Noah (The Walking Dead), a character from the television series The Walking Dead
Noah Clan ("Noah no Ichizoku"), the primary antagonists of the D.Gray-man fictional universe manga/anime
 Ultraman Noa, the true form of Ultraman Nexus from the eponymous series
 Noah Carver, a character in the Power Rangers Megaforce
 Noah Beckett in the television show Second Noah
 Noah, a character from Total Drama series
 Noah, the main character of Xenoblade Chronicles 3

Films
 The Noah (1975), a post-apocalyptic fiction film written and directed by Daniel Bourla
 Noah (1998 film), a 1998 TV film directed by Ken Kwapis
 Noah (2013 film), a 2013 Canadian short film directed by Walter Woodman and Patrick Cederberg
 Noah (2014 film), a 2014 epic biblical drama film directed by Darren Aronofsky

Music 
 Noah (band), an Indonesian band
 Noah (duo), a Danish musical duo
 Noah (Noah album), the 2013 debut album of duo Noah above
 Noah (The Bob Seger System album) (1969)
 Noah (Noah Stewart album) (2012)
 "Noah", a song by Harry Belafonte
 "Noah", a song by David and the Giants
 "Noah", a song by Diaura from Versus

Other arts, entertainment, and media
 Noah (sura), the 71st chapter of the Quran
 Noah (TV series), a 2010 Philippine TV series
 Noah, a common collective name for the three sketches about Noah by Bill Cosby from his album Bill Cosby Is a Very Funny Fellow...Right! (1963)
 Noé (Noah), a play by André Obey

Organizations
 FC Noah, is an Armenian professional football club based in Yerevan, Armenia
 NOAH, the Danish affiliate of Friends of the Earth Europe
 National Oceanic and Atmospheric Administration, a scientific agency from the United States
 National Office of Animal Health, a UK trade association
 National Organization for Albinism and Hypopigmentation
 Pro Wrestling Noah, a professional wrestling promotion based in Japan

Other uses
 Naturally occurring affordable housing
 Noah grape, a wine grape
 Project NOAH (Philippines), a national disaster risk reduction program and mobile application in the Philippines
 Toyota Noah, a vehicle model

See also 
 Noa (disambiguation)
 Noach (parsha), a parshah or portion in the annual Jewish cycle of Torah reading
 Noahidism